Pogoń Grodzisk Mazowiecki is a Polish football club based in Grodzisk Mazowiecki, Masovian Voivodeship. They compete in the fourth-tier III liga.

Their highest league tier is III liga (then the third tier), with their first promotion in 1958. They were promoted to this level again after winning the 2020–21 III liga group I, ensuring the promotion with two games left after beating Jagiellonia Białystok II 6–0.

Honours
III liga
 Winners''' (1): 2020–21

Current squad

References

External links
  
 Pogoń Grodzisk Mazowiecki at 90minut.pl 

 
Grodzisk Mazowiecki County
Association football clubs established in 1922
1922 establishments in Poland
Football clubs in Masovian Voivodeship